The Master Plan is the third studio album by Canadian hip hop group Dream Warriors, released October 25, 1996 on EMI Records in the United Kingdom and Canada. It spawned the singles "Float On", "What Do You Want "Ladies"", and "Sound Clash".

Compared to their previous albums, The Master Plan is more Caribbean-influenced, featuring collaborations with artists such as Beenie Man and General Degree. It was nominated for Best Rap Recording at the 1997 Juno Awards. Later that year, Spek and DJ Luv left the group.

Track listing

References 

1996 albums
Dream Warriors albums
EMI Records albums